Grasonville is a census-designated place (CDP) in Queen Anne's County, Maryland, United States. The population was 2,193 at the 2000 census.

Geography
Grasonville is located at  (38.962875, −76.203305).

Demographics

As of the 2010 census, there were 3,425 people, 1,248 households, and 871 families residing in the CDP. The population density was 619.9 people per square mile. The racial makeup of the CDP was 72.06% White, 20.06% African American, 0.64% Native American, 1.49% Asian, 2.92% from other races, and 2.83% from two or more races. Hispanic or Latino of any race were 5.52% of the population.

There were 1,248 total occupied households. 659 (52.8%) of Grasonville households were married couples living together, 144 (11.5%) had a female householder with no husband present, and 377 (30.2%) were non-families. 286 households were made up of individuals, and 116 had someone living alone who was 65 years of age or older. The average household size was 2.73 and the average family size was 3.21.

In the CDP, the population was spread out, with 28.5% under the age of 18, 8.3% from 18 to 24, 27.8% from 25 to 44, 26.2% from 45 to 64, and 12.6% who were 65 years of age or older. The median age was 37.7 years. For every 100 females, there were 99.1 males. 

According to the American Community Survey, the median income for a household in the CDP was $82,467, and the median income for a family was $105,078. The per capita income for the CDP was $33,560. About 8.5% of families and 13.5% of the population were below the poverty line, including 21.5% of those under age 18 and 9.5% of those age 65 or over.

References

Census-designated places in Queen Anne's County, Maryland
Census-designated places in Maryland
Maryland populated places on the Chesapeake Bay